New Richmond may refer to the following places:

In Canada:
 New Richmond, Quebec

In the United States:
 New Richmond, Indiana
 New Richmond, Michigan
 New Richmond, Ohio
 New Richmond, West Virginia
 New Richmond, Wisconsin